Daxin is a town under the administration of Taihe County, Fuyang, Anhui, China. , it has nine villages under its administration:
Xinji Village
Xinzhuang Village
Guangjin Village
Chantang Village
Dongmiao Village
Zhanglukou Village
Zhanglou Village
Lige Village
Huayuan Village

References 

Township-level divisions of Anhui
Taihe County, Anhui